DoubleTree by Hilton is an American hotel chain managed by Hilton Worldwide. DoubleTree has been the fastest growing Hilton brand by number of properties since 2007, and by number of rooms from 2007 to 2015. As of December 31, 2019, it has 587 properties with 135,745 rooms in 47 countries and territories, including 122 that are managed with 35,122 rooms.

DoubleTree competes in the full service category, alongside sister chain Hilton Hotels & Resorts. Among the many signature things that DoubleTree is known for are their chocolate chip cookies, which were originally made in the early 1980s for VIPs but now given to all guests and made by Nashville-based Christie Cookie Company for over 30 years. In 2020, during the COVID-19 pandemic the brand published a home-adapted recipe for their cookies.

History
The first DoubleTree hotel opened in Scottsdale, Arizona, in 1969. It was located on the grounds of Scottsdale Fashion Square and was built by Sam Kitchell. The DoubleTree Hotels Corporation merged with the Guest Quarters Hotels Partnership of Boston in December 1993. The acquired hotels were rebranded under the DoubleTree name. The Doubletree Corporation later merged with the Promus Hotel Corporation in December 1997, bringing together the DoubleTree, Red Lion, Hampton Inn, and Embassy Suites brands. In December 1999, Hilton Hotels Corporation acquired Promus Hotel Corporation, which brought Doubletree Hotels and other Promus hotel brands under the umbrella of the newly renamed Hilton Worldwide. In early 2011, Hilton Worldwide launched a logo and name rebranding for the chain, replacing the name "DoubleTree" with "DoubleTree by Hilton".

DoubleTree's strategy to grow the brand has been to convince operators of other brands to switch flags. This is in contrast to brands like Marriott or Sheraton which rely on new construction to grow their footprint. DoubleTree also provides lower cost options to improve properties, which help operators remain in the brand system.

On November 2, 2019, DoubleTree Cookie became the first cookie baked in space as ISS Commander Luca Parmitano of the European Space Agency baked the brand's cookie dough inside the prototype oven.

References

External links

 

1969 establishments in Arizona
American companies established in 1969
Hotels established in 1969
Hilton Hotels & Resorts hotels
Hilton Worldwide